Johann Vanna (6 December 1908 – 4 November 1950) is an Austrian former footballer.

Career statistics

References

1908 births
Year of death missing
Association football midfielders
Austrian footballers
SK Rapid Wien players
RC Strasbourg Alsace players